Dr Michael Daniels (born 1950) is a British transpersonal psychologist and parapsychologist. A Chartered Psychologist and Associate Fellow of the British Psychological Society, he was formerly a senior lecturer in Psychology at Liverpool John Moores University. He is currently the Editor of Transpersonal Psychology Review (The Journal of the British Psychological Society Transpersonal Psychology Section).

Daniels studied psychology at the University of Leeds, where he obtained a BSc (Hons, 1st Class) Psychology (1974), and PhD Psychology (1981). His doctoral dissertation examined the relationship of mental disorder and personality to Abraham Maslow's theory of self-actualization and Lawrence Kohlberg's theory of moral development. Daniels also trained and practiced for six years as an Honorary Psychotherapist (psychodynamic) within the British National Health Service.

Daniels is the author of two books and more than 30 journal articles and book chapters on observational methods, self-actualization theory, moral development, the psychology of the shadow and evil, Jungian psychology, transpersonal theory, mystical experience, parapsychology and poltergeists. He is also the developer of the Watchword Technique of Jungian self-analysis, of the parapsychology and psychical research website psychicscience.org, the transpersonal studies website transpersonalscience.org and the mind magic website mindmagician.org

Daniels has two daughters - Penny Daniels, born in 1991 and Lottie Daniels, born in 1993.

Selected bibliography 

Daniels, M. (2005). Shadow, Self, Spirit: Essays in Transpersonal Psychology. Exeter: Imprint Academic.

Daniels, M. (2002). The "Brother Doli" case: Investigation of apparent poltergeist-type manifestations in North Wales. Journal of the Society for Psychical Research, 66.4, No. 869, 193-221. Reprinted in R. Wiseman & C. Watt (eds.) (2005). Parapsychology (The International Library of Psychology). Ashgate Publishing.

Daniels, M. (1992 / 2012). Self-Discovery the Jungian Way: The Watchword Technique. London & New York: Routledge (Revised edition Lybrary.com, 2012).

Daniels, M. (1981). Morality and the Person: An Examination of the Relationship of Moral Development to Self-Actualization, Mental Disorder, and Personality. Unpublished doctoral dissertation, University of Leeds.

References

External links
Michael Daniels's Psychic Science Website
Michael Daniels's Transpersonal Science Website
Michael Daniels's Mind Magician Website
Watchword Technique of Jungian Self-Analysis

1950 births
Transpersonal psychologists
British psychologists
Parapsychologists
Alumni of the University of Leeds
Academics of Liverpool John Moores University
Living people